Edward Burgess (1848–1891) was an American yacht designer. Several of his boats won fame in the waters of the eastern United States.

Early life and education 
Edward Burgess was born in West Sandwich, Massachusetts on June 30, 1848, the fifth son of Benjamin Franklin Burgess (1818–1909) and Cordelia Williams Ellis (1821–1876). The Burgess family were merchants who made their money in the West Indies trade and lost it in 1879.

Burgess was educated at Harvard, graduating in 1871, and became secretary of the Boston Society of Natural History, in which capacity he edited the publications of the society, and published several memoirs on anatomical subjects. In 1879, he became instructor in entomology at Harvard, remaining until 1883. He traveled in Europe and, in an amateur way, studied the principles of naval architecture, bringing his knowledge and judgment to the practical test of designing and building vessels for his own use. He relied on this when he turned to the design of sailing yachts for a living in 1883.

Yacht design 

Several of his boats won fame in the waters of the eastern United States. He designed the largest steel hull schooner at the time Constellation for E.D. Morgan in 1889. In 1884, a committee of Bostonians selected him to design a large sloop yacht to represent the United States in a series of international races. From his designs, Puritan was built; she easily defeated Genesta (English) for the America's Cup in 1885.  This was a remarkable triumph in view of the fact that it was the first attempt of an American designer to solve certain shipbuilding problems to which Englishmen had given their attention for a score of years.

In 1886, his Mayflower, slightly larger than Puritan, led in the race with the English Galatea.  In 1888, Burgess' fishing schooner Carrie E. Phillips outdistanced four competitors in the fisherman's race held in Boston harbor.  His Volunteer won the America's cup against the Thistle in 1887. His other yachts included the Mariquita and Gossoon, both remarkably swift sloops designed to counter the success of the Clyde-built cutter Minerva (William Fife, 1888).

In his seven years of work as a yacht designer, Burgess designed 137 vessels, that included 38 cutters, 35 steam yachts, 29 catboats, 17 sloops, 11 fishing-vessels, 3 pilot-boats, 3 working-vessels, and 1 yawl. His  son William Starling Burgess would follow him in his profession of yacht design. Examples of pilot boats Burgess designed were the Varuna and the Adams.

Personal life 
Burgess married Caroline Louisa Sullivant on June 2, 1877 in Boston. They had two sons, William Starling Burgess and Charles Paine Burgess. His family had a home in Beverly, Massachusetts near current day Lynch Park.

Burgess died July 12, 1891 of typhoid fever. Caroline died September 16, 1891 in Boston of pneumonia. They are both buried at Mount Auburn Cemetery lot #1167 Geranium Path.

Burgess was inducted into the America's Cup Hall of Fame in 1994.

Notes

Sources 

Boston's North Shore by Joseph E.Garland. Published 1978.
Benjamin Franklin Burgess Obituary, NEHGS Register Volume 65 xlviii, 1911.
139.Benjamin Franklin Burgess genealogy.
Tasha Tudor ancestry.

External links 
 The location of the early Burgess summer cottage is now Lynch Park  in Beverly, Massachusetts. Latter it was owned by the Evans Family who hosted President William Howard Tafts 1910 summer "Whitehouse".
 A map of Beverly Cove from the 1872 Atlas of Essex County plate 95, showing the Burgess cottage off Ober Street on Woodbury Point.

1848 births
1891 deaths
America's Cup yacht designers
Harvard University alumni
American yacht designers
People from Sandwich, Massachusetts
Deaths from typhoid fever